Coixtlahuaca (Chocho: Nguichee; Mixtec: Yodzocoo; Nahuatl: Coaixtlahuacan) was a pre-Columbian Mesoamerican state in the Mixteca Alta (now in Oaxaca, Mexico). Coixtlahuaca was a multi-ethnic polity, inhabited by both Chochos and Mixtecs. In addition to the Chocho and Mixtec languages, Nahuatl was used as a lingua franca. Its name means "plain of snakes".  The state also exerted power over the Cuicatecans.

Coixtlahuaca was conquered by the Aztecs under Moctezuma I in the 15th century.

According to Hernán Cortés, envoys of Coixtlahuaca surrendered to the Spanish in September 1520. Coixtlahuaca was incorporated into New Spain as the municipality of San Juan Bautista Coixtlahuaca.

See also
Atonal II

References

Mesoamerica
Mixteca Region